Anna Svea Maria Strömkvist (née Pettersson; born 1964) is a Swedish politician and former member of the Riksdag, the national legislature. A member of the Social Democratic Party, she represented Dalarna County between September 2014 and September 2022.

Strömkvist was educated in Piteå. She worked as a care assistant in Piteå Municipality between 1983 and 1989. She worked for the Swedish Social Democratic Youth League (SSU) in Dalarna between 1989 and 1992. She was a nurse in Ludvika Municipality between 1995 and 1997.

References

1964 births
Living people
Members of the Riksdag 2014–2018
Members of the Riksdag 2018–2022
Members of the Riksdag from the Social Democrats
Women members of the Riksdag
21st-century Swedish women politicians